is a railway station in the city of Nagaoka, Niigata, Japan, operated by East Japan Railway Company (JR East).

Lines
Echigo-Iwatsuka Station is served by the Shin'etsu Main Line and is 60.5 kilometers from the terminus of the line at Naoetsu Station.

Station layout
The station consists of two ground-level opposed side platforms connected by a footbridge serving two tracks. The station is unattended.

Platforms

History
Echigo-Iwatsuka Station opened on 1 June 1945.  With the privatization of Japanese National Railways (JNR) on 1 April 1987, the station came under the control of JR East.

Surrounding area
Iwatsuka Post Office
Hotokusan Inari Taisha

See also
 List of railway stations in Japan

External links

 JR East station information 

Railway stations in Nagaoka, Niigata
Railway stations in Japan opened in 1945
Shin'etsu Main Line
Stations of East Japan Railway Company